Avatiu is a settlement on Rarotonga in the Cook Islands. It is located on the north coast to the west of the capital Avarua and is the location of Rarotonga's main port.

Notable buildings include a Mormon church and family history centre, and a branch of the Cook Islands Trading Company. The town's sportsground is known as "The Swamp" after the adjacent Avatiu Swamp.

References

Populated places in the Cook Islands
Rarotonga